Robert Harold "Nat" Young (born 14 November 1947) is an Australian surfer and author.

Surfing career 
Born in Sydney, New South Wales, Young grew up in the small coastal suburb of Collaroy. In 1964, he was runner-up in the Australian junior championship at Manly, and two years later was named world surfing champion in 1966. He won the title again (then called the Smirnoff World Pro/Am) in 1970. Young won three Australian titles in 1966, 1967 and 1969, and won the Bells Beach Surf Classic three times.

Young featured in a number of important surf films of 1960s and 1970s including the classic 1973 surf movie Crystal Voyager and he also had a featured role as surfer Nick Naylor in the 1979 Australian drama film Palm Beach.

Post-surfing career 
Young ran for NSW Parliament in the 1986 by-election for the seat of Pittwater. Labor did not run a candidate, and he was narrowly defeated by Liberal candidate Jim Longley.

Since retiring from professional surfing, Young has written several books about surfing and sailboarding in Australia. His son Beau Young has also seen some success in the sport, winning the World Longboard title in 2000 and again in 2003.

In 2000, Young was a victim of 'surf rage' when he was severely bashed on his home break of Angourie after a long-running feud and heated altercation with another local surfer. During his recovery he wrote a book titled Surf Rage, calling for greater tolerance and mutual respect in the surfing community, although Young admitted he had acted aggressively during his career (where he had earned the nickname "The Animal"), and had acted provocatively towards his attacker, whom he met and forgave several months after the incident.

Publications

 Young, Nat (2008). The complete history of surfing: from water to snow. Utah: Gibbs Smith. 
 Young, Nat (2019). Church of the Open Sky. Michael Joseph.

References

External links
 
Nat Young: Surfing Legend(official site)
Nat Young biography at Surfline.com

1947 births
Living people
Australian surfers
Australian sportswriters
World Surf League surfers
Sport Australia Hall of Fame inductees